Azake Luboyera (born 6 April 1998) is a Ugandan footballer who plays as a forward.

Playing career

Youth
Beginning his career at Hans Production Academy in Uganda, Luboyera later joined Aspire Academy in Qatar in 2012. After leaving Aspire in 2014, Luboyera joined the Ottawa Fury youth system in 2015.

Ottawa Fury
On 20 July 2017 Luboyera signed his first professional contract with the Ottawa Fury. He made his professional debut for Ottawa nine days later, scoring the opening goal in a 2–0 win over Toronto FC II.

International career
Luboyera made two appearances for the Uganda under-20 national team in the 2017 Africa U-20 Cup of Nations qualifiers against Rwanda, scoring a brace in the second match.

References

1998 births
Living people
Association football forwards
Ugandan footballers
Ugandan expatriate footballers
Expatriate footballers in Qatar
Expatriate soccer players in Canada
Ugandan expatriate sportspeople in Qatar
Ugandan expatriate sportspeople in Canada
Aspire Academy (Senegal) players
Ottawa Fury FC players
Première ligue de soccer du Québec players
USL Championship players